Mohammadabad-e Asghar Khan (also Romanized as Moḩammadābād-e Aṣghar Khān; also known as Moḩammadābād-e Karīmkhān) is a village in Rigan Rural District, in the Central District of Rigan County, Kerman Province, Iran. At the 2006 census, its population was 671, in 125 families.

References 

Populated places in Rigan County